Marcos Ramírez may refer to:

 Marcos Ramírez (footballer) (born 1983), Argentine football defender
 Marcos Ramirez (boxer) (born 1981), American boxer
 Marcos Ramírez (motorcyclist) (born 1997), Spanish motorcycle racer

See also
Marco Ramírez (disambiguation)